The 1900 Yale Bulldogs football team was an American football team that represented Yale University as an independent during the 1900 college football season. The team finished with a 12–0 record, shut out ten of twelve opponents, and outscored all opponents by a total of 336 to 10. Malcolm McBride was the head coach, and Gordon Brown was the team captain.

Yale is the only team retroactively named as the national champion for 1900 by NCAA-designated "major selectors". Those include the Billingsley Report, Helms Athletic Foundation, Houlgate System, National Championship Foundation, and Parke H. Davis.

Seven Yale players were selected as consensus first-team players on the 1900 All-America team. The team's consensus All-Americans were: quarterback William Fincke; halfback George B. Chadwick; fullback Perry Hale; center Herman Olcott; guard Gordon Brown; and tackles George S. Stillman and James Bloomer.

Schedule

References

Yale
Yale Bulldogs football seasons
College football national champions
College football undefeated seasons
Yale Bulldogs football